The Partenavia P.68, now Vulcanair P68, is a light aircraft designed by Luigi Pascale and initially built by Italian Partenavia.
It made its first flight on 25 May 1970, its type certification was granted on 17 November 1971 and was transferred to Vulcanair in 1998.
The original six-seat high-wing monoplane is powered by twin piston engines and is used for light transport and training. The P.68 Observer is an observation aircraft variant, and it was developed in a stretched, 10/11-seat twin turboprop derivative.

Development

Partenavia P.68 Victor
The type certification for the P.68 Victor, a twin piston engine, high wing monoplane with fixed tricycle landing gear was applied for on 22 January 1969.
The Partenavia P.68 was designed as a six-seat light transport and trainer powered by two  Lycoming IO-360 engines, it made its first flight on 25 May 1970 at Naples.
The type certification for the 9.20 m (30.18 ft) long P.68 was granted by the Italian Civil Aviation Authority on 17 November 1971 for an 1860 kg (4100 lb) MTOW.
It was approved by the FAA on 7 December 1971.
After a 300 h of flight tests, production was to start in May 1972 in a new plant at Naples Capodichino Airport at a rate of three aircraft per month.
The prototype was built at Arzano, Italy, production began with 14 pre-production aircraft at new facilities in Casoria, Italy.

The longer, 9.35 m (30.68 ft) P.68B Victor certification was applied for on 18 October 1973 and granted on 24 May 1974 for a 1960 kg (4321 lb) MTOW.
Its unit cost was US$82,000 in 1974 (US$ today).
Its fuselage was lengthened to create more space in the cockpit.

Both derived from the P.68B and 9.55 m (31.33 ft) long, the P.68R Victor has a retractable landing gear and was certified on 31 July 1978 while the P.68C has a nose allowing a weather radar, larger fuel tanks and increased weights, and was certified on 23 July 1979 with a 1990 kg (4387 lb) MTOW.
The P.68C-TC, certified on 29 April 1980, has turbocharged,  Lycoming TIO-360-C1A6D engines.
In 2021, the equipped price of the P.68C was US$1.19M, US$1.22M for the P.68R and US$1.31M for the P.68C-TC.

Partenavia P.68 Observer

The 9.43 m (30.94 ft) long P.68 Observer, derived from the P.68B with a transparent fuselage nose, adapted systems and larger fuel tanks, was certified on 12 June 1980.
The observation aircraft for law enforcement were initially conversions of existing aircraft by German Sportavia-Putzer.

The 9.15 m (30.02 ft) long P.68TC Observer, a P.68 "Observer" with turbocharged engines, was certified on 18 June 1985.

The 9.54 m (31.30 ft) long P.68 "Observer 2 is a P.68 "Observer", with increased weights, upturned wing tips and modified systems, and was certified on 30 November 1989 for a 2084 kg (4594 lb) MTOW.
−

Partenavia AP68TP-600 Viator

The 10.89-11.27 m (35.73-36.97 ft) long, retractable gear AP68TP-600 "Viator", with two  Allison 250-B17C turboprops, has a 2850–3000 kg (6283-6614 lb) MTOW and was certified on 16 October 1986.
In 2021, its equipped price was $3.154M.

Partenavia AP68TP-300 Spartacus
The 9.90 m (32.48 ft) long, fixed gear AP68TP-300 Spartacus was certified on 10 December 1983 with two  Allison 250-B17C turboprops and a 2600 kg (5732 lb) MTOW.
the nine-seater development was helped by Aeritalia, the prototype first flew in 1978 with a retractable undercarriage.

Based in Casoria, Naples, and already manufacturing Partenavia spares, Vulcanair (then Air Samanta) acquired the type certificate, aircraft spares and the former production plant in Milan for L1.4 billion ($780,000) in April 1998.
The type certificate was transferred on 25 November.
Vulcanair offers the P.68R, P68C, P.68C-TC, P.68TC Observer, P.68 Observer 2 and AP68TP-600 Viator.

Variants

Operators

Military and government operators

 
 Royal Bahamas Defence Force
 
 Chilean Navy
 
 Hesse State Police
 
 Italian State Police
 
 National Police Air Service
 
 California Department of Fish and Game
 New York State Police
 Tennessee Wildlife Resources Agency
 Washington State Department of Natural Resources

Former
 
 Bophutatswana Air Force

Incidents and accidents

The P.68 was involved in 86 accidents and incidents worldwide as reported in the Aviation Safety Network wiki database, including 58 hull losses.

September 11, 1983: A P.68C, N29561, performing an aerobatic display broke up in flight during an airshow in Plainview, Texas. The NTSB report revealed that analysis of the video showed the aircraft performed a fly-by over the runway, exceeding its Vne (Velocity, never-exceed) speed by 27 knots. The pilot then executed a sharp nose-up pitch change of about 8 degrees, which spiked the aircraft's dynamic load factor to 8.3Gs and caused both wings to fail in the main spar just outside both engine nacelles then separate from the aircraft, which then began rotating, causing the rear fuselage to twist along its length between its cabin and empennage. The aircraft then plummeted 250 feet down just beyond the group of spectators.

Specifications (P.68C)

See also
 Aero Commander 500 family
 Beechcraft Baron
 Britten-Norman BN-2 Islander
 Cessna 310
 Diamond DA62
 Piper PA-34 Seneca

Notes

References

Further reading

 
 
 
 
 

P.68
Vulcanair aircraft
1970s Italian civil utility aircraft
Aircraft first flown in 1970
High-wing aircraft
Twin piston-engined tractor aircraft